Mordovsky (masculine), Mordovskaya (feminine), or Mordovskoye (neuter) is the name of several rural localities in Russia:
Mordovsky (rural locality), a settlement in Zhilinsky Selsoviet of Buzuluksky District of Orenburg Oblast
Mordovskoye, Ivanovo Oblast, a selo in Yuzhsky District of Ivanovo Oblast
Mordovskoye, Kaliningrad Oblast, a settlement in Dobrinsky Rural Okrug of Guryevsky District of Kaliningrad Oblast
Mordovskoye, Nizhny Novgorod Oblast, a village in Kalininsky Selsoviet of Pavlovsky District of Nizhny Novgorod Oblast